Lucille Godiveau (born 18 April 1987) is a French female rugby union player. She represented  at the 2010 Women's Rugby World Cup.

References

1987 births
Living people
French female rugby union players
France international women's rugby sevens players